The Meseta la Galera Natural Monument Also La Galera Plateau Is a protected area with the status of a natural monument consisting of a mountainous formation of the state of Mérida in the Andes of the South American country of Venezuela, in the form of Tepuy level plate of approximately 1 km in length. It has an area of 95 ha and has a height of 1055 msnm at its highest point and 935 m.s.n.m. At its lowest point is located between the parishes of El Llano and Tovar in the city center of the city separating this one from the Mocotíes River and the Hill "Loma de La Virgen".

It constitutes a geological formation of singular beauty and attractive landscape in the urban area, full of greenery which is considered as an important lung of the city. It was decreed a natural monument of Venezuela by the then president of the republic Carlos Andrés Pérez according to Decree No. 2352 of June 5, 1992 and published in Official Gazette No. 4548 (Extraordinary) of March 26, 1993 as a Geomorphological Unit deposited during the Quaternary, of fluvial origin.

See also
List of national parks of Venezuela
Pico Codazzi Natural Monument

References

Natural monuments of Venezuela
Protected areas established in 1992